The Lake Wobegon Trail Marathon is a 26.2 mile foot race from Holdingford, Minnesota, to St. Joseph, Minnesota, on a paved trail called the Lake Wobegon Trail. 
The course is USATF-certified, making it a qualifying race for the Boston Marathon. The race is sponsored and organized by the St. Cloud River Runners, a running group active since 1983 with about 150 members.

Course
The flat, straight course is run on a blacktop trail converted from freight rail lines. After starting at the high school in Holdingford, the route quickly links to the Lake Wobegon Trail and goes southwest to the small town of Albany. On the outskirts of the town, the trail turns directly east and passes over the South Branch of Two Rivers, past two smaller lakes and a state-designated science and nature area.
The path continues through farm land and then over the small gap of land between Middle Spunk Lake and Lower Spunk Lake on the east side of Avon. The course passes two more lakes before finishing in St. Joseph.

The Lake Wobegon Trail is maintained by the Stearns County Parks, local trail groups, the Minnesota Department of Transportation and the seven cities through which it passes.

The trail is named after a fictional region in Minnesota that appears in author and radio personality Garrison Keillor's stories. He has called the trail one of "ordinary beauty," a landscape of farms, woodland patches and small town-Americana.

Records and history
Two St. Cloud River Runners initially launched the event: Sartell teacher Joe Perske and St. Cloud lawyer Sharon Hobbs. They gained the support of local community members and mayors, and in the 2008 inaugural race, 80 runners finished. By 2010, the number of participants had grown to 200.

The course record for the marathon was set in 2015 by Chad Lutz, who ran it in 2:33:59. The race was first run in 2008, when 80 people from 12 states and Canada registered. The first race was sponsored by the St. Cloud-based law firm Rinke-Noonan. More recently, the race has seen a steady registration in the 400 runner range. The race is capped at 450 runners, according to 2018 race director George Bienusa. 

A tragedy took place during the race in 2011, when a 35-year-old man from Byron, Minnesota, collapsed after finishing and suffered a cardiac arrest. Medical personnel attended to him, but he passed away.

In May of 2016, the 216-foot wooden-planked bridge at Schwinghammer Lake was set aflame by an arsonist, but a quick response by a bicyclist and fire fighters kept the bridge structurally sound, and the marathon did not have to be rerouted.

Seven runners have a streak of participating in the race every year (as of 2018). 

On April 2, 2020, more than a month before the May 9 race date, the race officials canceled the 12th running of the marathon due to the COVID-19 pandemic. In a press release, the marathon organizers said they would "join numerous other events in an attempt to protect runners, volunteers and emergency medical personnel by putting [participants'] health and safety first."

As the 2021 race approached, Minnesotans reached nearly 50 percent vaccination rate for adults. The race directors decided to run the race with a staggered start and a 250-participant cap, per the Minnesota Department of Health recommendations. It would be the first road marathon back in the state since the Mankato Marathon on Oct. 12, 2019. The week of the Lake Wobegon race, Governor Tim Waltz issued new guidelines that stated wearing masks wasn't necessary while with groups of less than 500 people outdoors. The guidelines also dropped limits on the number of people allowed in outdoor gatherings. The race, which was labeled a Road Runners Club state championship, saw faster than average times, with the top three marking the fourth-, fifth- and sixth-all-time fastest runs on the course since its inception in 2008.

Marathon race results

Key:

All cities in Minnesota unless indicated otherwise

References

External links

Lake Wobegon Trail Marathon Facebook Group

Foot races in Minnesota
Marathons in Minnesota
Marathons in the United States
Recurring sporting events established in 2008